Mantes-la-Jolie (often informally called Mantes) is a commune in the Yvelines department in the Île-de-France region of north-central France. It is located to the west of Paris,  from the centre of the capital. Mantes-la-Jolie is a subprefecture; in 2016, it had a population of 44,231.

History
Mantes was halfway between the centres of power of the dukes of Normandy at Rouen and the Kings of France at Paris. Along with most of northern France, it changed hands frequently in the Hundred Years' War. Philip Augustus died at Mantes, 14 July 1223.

Louis XIV instituted the manufacture of musical instruments in Mantes, and it was chosen as the centre of brass and woodwind instrument manufacture. In the 19th century, painters were attracted to the town, particularly Corot, whose paintings of the bridge and the cathedral are celebrated. Prokofiev spent the summer of 1920 there orchestrating the ballet Chout.

Originally officially called Mantes-sur-Seine (meaning "Mantes upon Seine"), Mantes merged with the commune of Gassicourt in 1930 and the commune born of the merger was called Mantes-Gassicourt.

Mantes was the location of the first allied bridgehead across the Seine on 19 August 1944, by General Patton's 3rd Army. Major rebuilding was needed after the war.

On 7 May 1953, the commune of Mantes-Gassicourt was officially renamed Mantes-la-Jolie (meaning "Mantes the pretty"), allegedly in reference to a letter of King Henry IV addressed to his mistress Gabrielle d'Estrées who resided in Mantes: "I am on my way to Mantes, my pretty".

Art

At the end of the 19th century, Impressionist painters like Pierre-Auguste Renoir, Édouard Manet and Claude Monet came to paint the Seine River which crosses the town.
Jean Batiste Corot painting of the Old Mantes bridge is shown at the Louvres

Population
Inhabitants are called Mantais in French. The city had a total of 44,299 inhabitants in 2017. The population data in the table and graph below refer to the commune of Mantes-la-Jolie proper, in its geography at the given years. The commune of Mantes-la-Jolie absorbed the former communes of Gassicourt in 1930.

The city is divided into four districts each with a characteristic urban form:
 Centre-ville: city center, a dense and commercial area
 Gassicourt: residential area
 Val Fourré: large housing district
 Hautes Garennes: a non-urbanized area

Sights

The main monument in Mantes is the church of Notre-Dame dating back to 12th century. A previous church was burnt down by William the Conqueror together with the rest of  the town, at the capture of which he lost his life in 1087. Modern bridges link Mantes with the town of Limay on the other side of the river.

Economy
Mantes is home to small businesses working on concrete and chemical processing, but is inevitably drawn into the economic area of nearby Paris.

It is historically and at present a center of musical instrument manufacturing. The well known Buffet Crampon woodwind factory is located in the neighbourhood city of Mantes-la-Ville.

Transportation
The Mantes-la-Jolie station is also served by TGV trains towards Le Havre, and Cherbourg.

Education 
The municipality has nineteen public preschools, sixteen public elementary schools, six public junior high schools, two public senior high schools/sixth form colleges, and a private secondary school.

Public junior high schools:
Collège André Chénier
Collège Paul Cézanne
Collège Jules Ferry
Collège Louis Pasteur
Collège de Gassicourt
Collège Georges Clemenceau

Public senior high schools:
 Lycée Saint-Exupéry
 Lycée Polyvalent Jean Rostand

Private secondary schools:
Collège-Lycée Notre-Dame

Colleges and universities:
 University Institute of Technology of Mantes en Yvelines
 Versailles Saint-Quentin-en-Yvelines University

International relations

Mantes-la-Jolie is twinned with:
 Hillingdon, England, United Kingdom
 Maia, Portugal
 Schleswig, Germany

Notable people
Nicolas Bernier (1664–1734), composer.
Jonathan Bumbu (b. 1999), footballer
Faudel (1978), singer
Sandy Casar (1979), cyclist
Benoit Poher (1979), singer
Angelo Tsagarakis (1984) basketball player
Saïd Hireche (1985), rugby player
Moussa Sow (*1986), footballer
Haoua Kessely (*1988) athlete
Omar Kossoko (*1988), footballer
Enock Kwateng (b. 1997), footballer
Kama Massampu (*1991), footballer
Claudine Mendy (*1990), handball player
Oumar N'Diaye (*1985), footballer
Opa Nguette (*1994), footballer
Haby Niare  (*1993), taekwondo
Hamady Tamboura (*1989), footballer
Nicolas Pépé (*1995), footballer
Audrey Fleurot (*1977), actress

See also
Communes of the Yvelines department

References

External links

 Mantes-la-Jolie city council website

Communes of Yvelines
Subprefectures in France